Tory Dobrin is the artistic director of the American all-male Les Ballets Trockadero de Monte Carlo. He first joined the Trocks (as they are widely known) in 1980 as a dancer.

See also
Dance in the United States
List of ballet companies in the United States

References

American male ballet dancers
Year of birth missing (living people)
Living people
Place of birth missing (living people)